Denis Philip Henry (7 July 1907 – 27 March 1990) was an English cricketer.

Born at Stamford Hill, Henry played a single first-class cricket for the Free Foresters against Oxford University at Oxford in 1948. Batting once in the match, Henry was dismissed for a single run by Basil Robinson. He died at Chichester in March 1990, aged 82.

References

External links

1907 births
1990 deaths
People from Stamford Hill
English cricketers
Free Foresters cricketers